Richard Edward Bauer (born January 10, 1977) is an American former professional baseball pitcher, who played for the Baltimore Orioles, Texas Rangers, and Cleveland Indians of Major League Baseball (MLB). He also played for the LG Twins of the KBO League.

Early life 
Bauer is a 1995 graduate of Centennial High School in Boise, Idaho, and played two seasons for Treasure Valley Community College in Ontario, Oregon.

Professional career 
Bauer was selected by the Baltimore Orioles in the fifth round of the  amateur draft. He was a starting pitcher in the Orioles minor league system from 1997 through , compiling a 41–39 record in 119 games (114 starts) with a 4.39 ERA in 666 innings pitched.

Bauer made his major league debut in a start against the Seattle Mariners on September 2, 2001, a 1-0 loss in which he surrendered just one run on three hits and two walks in 6 innings. He pitched primarily in relief for Baltimore from 2001 through , making 116 relief appearances and nine starts and compiling an 8–13 record with a 4.58 ERA in 240 innings pitched.

Bauer was released by the Orioles after the 2005 season and signed a minor league contract with Texas in November 2005. He was called up to the Rangers April 7, and remained with the team throughout the 2006 season. In 57 relief appearances and one start, he pitched 71 innings and posted a 3–1 record with two saves and a career-best 3.55 ERA. He was not available to pitch the final week of the season because of tendinitis in his pitching shoulder.

In January , the Rangers avoided salary arbitration with Bauer when they signed him to a $730,000, one-year contract. But after a poor spring training, he was designated for assignment and waived by the club. He signed a minor league deal with the Philadelphia Phillies on April 6, 2007, but was released by their International League affiliate, the Ottawa Lynx, on June 20. He signed another minor league contract with the Los Angeles Dodgers on July 1 playing for their Pacific Coast League affiliate, the Las Vegas 51s.

Bauer signed a minor league contract with an invitation to spring training with the Cleveland Indians on November 30, 2007. On July 4, Bauer was designated for assignment by the Indians; he refused a minor league assignment and was released. On July 11, 2008, Bauer signed a minor league contract with the Toronto Blue Jays and became a free agent at the end of the season. In November 2008, he re-signed with the Blue Jays. However, he was released at the end of spring training.

Later years 
Bauer had signed with the York Revolution in the Atlantic League for the 2009 season, but on May 13, 2009, he signed with the LG Twins in South Korea. He was released from the Twins with an injury on July 22, 2009.

On March 28, 2010, Bauer signed a minor league contract with the Colorado Rockies. On April 12, 2010, Bauer signed a contract with the Long Island Ducks of the Atlantic League. He was later released, and on July 14, signed a contract with the Lancaster Barnstormers of the Atlantic League.

On February 21, 2012, Bauer signed a minor league contract with the Los Angeles Dodgers but was released during spring training.

References

External links

Career statistics and player information from Korea Baseball Organization

1977 births
Living people
American expatriate baseball players in Canada
American expatriate baseball players in South Korea
Baltimore Orioles players
Baseball players from California
Buffalo Bisons (minor league) players
Cleveland Indians players
Fort Worth Cats players
KBO League pitchers
Lancaster Barnstormers players
Las Vegas 51s players
LG Twins players
Long Island Ducks players
Major League Baseball pitchers
Ottawa Lynx players
People from Garden Grove, California
People from Meridian, Idaho
Rochester Red Wings players
Texas Rangers players
Treasure Valley Chukars baseball players
York Revolution players
Azucareros del Este players
Bowie Baysox players
Delmarva Shorebirds players
Frederick Keys players
Syracuse Chiefs players
American expatriate baseball players in the Dominican Republic